The Arsenal P-M02 is a semi-automatic pistol manufactured by Bulgarian Arsenal Corp. since 1999.

The pistol operates by gas-delayed blowback. When the gun is fired, powder gasses are bled into a chamber below the barrel, and act on a piston there to prevent the slide opening. Once the bullet leaves the barrel, the pressure drops rapidly, allowing the slide to move backwards, extracting and ejecting the cartridge case and chambering a fresh cartridge on the return stroke. The double-action trigger group is easily removed for repairs. The safety catch is ambidextrous and situated on the slide, with controls pointing towards the back. The double-stack magazine holds 15 rounds.

External links 
 
 Modern Firearms – Handguns – Arsenal P-M02 pistol

9mm Parabellum semi-automatic pistols
Firearms of Bulgaria
Gas-delayed blowback firearms